Lotan Fisher is an Israeli bridge player ranked as a World Life Master by the World Bridge Federation. He first appeared in international competition at the 18th European Youth Team Championships in Torquay in 2002 where his schools division team placed first. He competed primarily in pairs and individual junior events until 2008.

In 2008, Fisher began a partnership with Ron Schwartz which brought them progressive prominence in junior teams and junior pairs world competitions through to 2011, including several first-place finishes. In 2011, Fisher and Schwartz won the World Transnational Open Team Championship. Subsequently, they entered European based open team competitions with continued success as members of the Israeli team, including six top ten finishes. 
Fisher won several World and European medals together with different partners at the youth events from 2009 to 2013.

In May 2016, the European Bridge League imposed bans on both players for cheating.

Bridge accomplishments

Wins
 European Youth Team Championships - Schools Teams (1) 2002
 World Series Championships - Junior Teams (1) 2010
 European Youth Team Championships - Junior Teams (1) 2011
 World Team Championships - Transnational Teams (1) 2011 
 Cavendish Invitational Pairs (1) 2012
 European Team Championships - Open Teams (1) 2014
 North American Bridge Championships (1)
 Spingold (1) 2014; (note:  title stripped by ACBL)

Runners-up
 World Bridge Games - Junior Pairs (1) 2008 
 European Youth Team Championships - Youngsters Teams (1) 2009
 World Youth Team Championships - Junior Teams (1) 2012

Cheating scandal

Notes

External links
 

Israeli contract bridge players